Bodferin is a former civil parish in the Welsh county of Gwynedd.  It was abolished in 1934, and incorporated into Aberdaron.

References

Villages in Gwynedd
Aberdaron